Michel Castellani (born 28 September 1945) is a French politician representing Pè a Corsica. He was elected to the French National Assembly on 18 June 2017, representing the department of Haute-Corse.

See also
 2017 French legislative election

References

1945 births
Living people
Deputies of the 15th National Assembly of the French Fifth Republic
Pè a Corsica politicians
People from Bastia
French people of Corsican descent
Deputies of the 16th National Assembly of the French Fifth Republic